Season 9 of the American competitive reality television series Hell's Kitchen premiered on July 18, 2011, on Fox and concluded on September 19, 2011, with a two-hour season finale. Jr. sous-chef Paul Niedermann won the season and was awarded a "head chef" position at BLT Steak in New York City, New York.

Gordon Ramsay returned as head chef, as Scott Leibfried and Andi van Willigan remained as sous chefs, as did James Lukanik as the maître d'. The entire season took about six weeks to film. It also saw the show return to its original one season per year schedule, having run two seasons each in 2009 and 2010 due to the after-effects of the 2007–2008 Writers Guild of America strike. 

Elise Wims tied with Autumn Lewis and Sabrina Brimhall for the record of most nominations in a season of Hell's Kitchen with seven nominations.

Contestants
18 chefs competed in season 9.

Notes

Contestant progress

Episodes

Notes

References

External links
Official site
BLT Steak restaurant home page

Hell's Kitchen (American TV series)
2011 American television seasons